Hasan bin Arifin is a Malaysian politician. He formerly served as Member of Parliament (MP) of Rompin for two terms. Hasan is a member of United Malays National Organisation (UMNO), a major component party of Barisan Nasional (BN) coalition.

Political career

Deputy Menteri Besar of Pahang
Hasan served as Deputy Menteri Besar of Pahang between 1995 and 1999 during his second-term as Member of the Legislative Assembly (MLA) of Pahang for Bukit Ibam.

Chairman of Public Accounts Committee
Hasan was nominated by Prime Minister of Malaysia Najib Razak to helm the post of chairman of the Public Accounts Committee (PAC) and appointed by Speaker of the House of Representatives Pandikar Amin Mulia on 19 October 2015. He took over from Nur Jazlan Mohamed who resigned from the PAC after being appointed Deputy Minister of Home Affairs by Najib.

Controversies
During his PAC Chairman tenure, Hasan was accused of tampering with the investigation into the 1Malaysia Development Berhad scandal involving then-Prime Minister Najib by Petaling Jaya Utara MP and fellow PAC member Tony Pua. He was accused to have, among many others, refusing to call additional witnesses before the PAC, deleting evidence from PAC's 1Malaysia Development Bhd (1MDB) report and ignoring evidence crucial to the investigation. Following his appointment, requests to reopen the investigation was rejected and it was later revealed that he had made attempts to shield Low Taek Jho, better known as Jho Low, the man who was central to the 1MDB scandal, by editing out portions involving Low in the PAC report. Earlier, he had also overturned his predecessor's decision to summon Low to the PAC for questioning.

According to ex-1MDB chief executive officer (CEO) Shahrol Azral Ibrahim Halmi's court testimony in the High Court, the PAC hearings on the 1MDB fiasco in 2010 and 2015 was nothing short of a farce where Hassan as PAC Chairman together with PAC member Abdul Rahman Dahlan along with fugitive businessman Jho Low had conspired to plot the outcome of the hearings. Hassan and Abdul Rahman who are both MP from BN, were exposed by Shahrol to be in conflict of interests since they were part of the PAC members who coached him on what to say during the PAC hearings.

Election results

Honours
  :
  Knight Companion of the Order of Sultan Ahmad Shah of Pahang (DSAP) – Dato’
  Grand Knight of the Order of Sultan Ahmad Shah of Pahang (SSAP) – Dato’ Sri (2015)

See also
 Rompin (federal constituency)

References

Living people
1953 births
People from Pahang
Malaysian people of Malay descent
Malaysian Muslims
United Malays National Organisation politicians
Members of the Dewan Rakyat
Members of the Pahang State Legislative Assembly
University of Malaya alumni
Asian Institute of Management alumni
21st-century Malaysian politicians
20th-century Malaysian politicians